Megachile matsumurai is a species of bee in the family Megachilidae. It was described by Hirashima & Maeta in 1974.

References

Matsumurai
Insects described in 1974